Sierra Baguales or Sierra de los Baguales is a mountain range in the southernmost Andes. It lies along the border between Chile and Argentina near the localities of Puerto Natales and Río Turbio.

Geology 
The mountain range contains a series of cirques formed by glaciers. Many cirques developed in the Pleistocene Epoch from isolated glaciers that existed separedly from ice sheets further west. The rocks of Sierra Baguales belong to various formations of Magallanes Basin. These rocks contain fossils of plants, mammals and marine invertebrates.

Stratigraphy 
From top to bottom the following formations make up Sierra Baguales:
 Santa Cruz Formation, sedimentary rocks belonging to a non-marine succession and hosting many vertebrate fossils
 Estancia 25 de Mayo Formation, a succession of fossil-bearing sedimentary rocks that date to the Early Miocene. Sediments were deposited in a marine environment.
 La Cumbre Formation, an olivine-bearing gabbro sill
 Río Leona Formation, a succession of non-marine fossils, some of which contain Nothofagus fossils
 Bandurrías Formation, an olivine-bearing gabbro sill
 Loreto Formation, sedimentary rocks variously assigned a Late Eocene to Early Miocene age. Contains fossil shark teeth.

On the eastern slopes of Sierra Baguales various lithic artifacts have been found. Human occupation of eastern foothills begun no later than 4,500 years before present.

References

Bibliography 
 

Mountain ranges of Argentina
Mountain ranges of Chile
Mountains of Magallanes Region
Landforms of Santa Cruz Province, Argentina
Última Esperanza Province
Argentina–Chile border